Lamsenspitze (elevation ) is a summit of the Karwendel range in the Austrian state of Tyrol.

Alpinism 
The easiest route to the summit is a steep track secured with fixed wire ropes starting at the Lamsenjoch Hut (Lamsenjochhütte) at the bottom of the steep eastern wall of the Lamsenspitze. Also a garden for climbers can be found there.

A second prominent route goes through a Via ferrata of mid difficulty that includes a climb through a tunnel called Brudertunnel or Lamstunnel. The Lamsenjoch Hut is reachable most easily starting from Pertisau or from the Ahornboden as a mountain hike.

There are two crosses at the summit, one of them can be seen from the Lamsenjoch Hut.

Mountains of the Alps
Two-thousanders of Austria
Mountains of Tyrol (state)